Dumortierite is a fibrous variably colored aluminium boro-silicate mineral, Al7BO3(SiO4)3O3. Dumortierite crystallizes in the orthorhombic system typically forming fibrous aggregates of slender prismatic crystals. The crystals are vitreous and vary in color from brown, blue, and green to more rare violet and pink. Substitution of iron and other tri-valent elements for aluminium result in the color variations. It has a Mohs hardness of 7 and a specific gravity of 3.3 to 3.4. Crystals show pleochroism from red to blue to violet. Dumortierite quartz is blue colored quartz containing abundant dumortierite inclusions.

Dumortierite was first described in 1881 for an occurrence in Chaponost, in the Rhône-Alps of France and named for the French paleontologist Eugène Dumortier (1803–1873). It typically occurs in high temperature aluminium rich regional metamorphic rocks, those resulting from contact metamorphism and also in boron rich pegmatites. The most extensive investigation on dumortierite was done on samples from the high grade metamorphic Gfohl unit in Austria by Fuchs et al. (2005).

It is used in the manufacture of high grade porcelain. It is sometimes mistaken for sodalite and has been used as imitation lapis lazuli.

Sources of Dumortierite include Austria, Brazil, Canada, France, Italy, Madagascar, Namibia, Nevada, Norway, Peru, Poland, Russia and Sri Lanka.

See also

List of minerals
List of minerals named after people

References

Mineral galleries
Dumortierite as a Commercial Mineral
 Dumortierite from Nevada

 

Aluminium minerals
Borate minerals
Nesosilicates
Gemstones
Orthorhombic minerals
Minerals in space group 62
Borosilicates